Men's Giant Slalom World Cup 1989/1990 was an event the 1990 Alpine Skiing World Cup won by Australia.

Calendar

Final point standings
In Men's Giant Slalom World Cup 1989/90 all results count.

Men's Giant Slalom Team Results
bold indicate highest score - italics indicate race wins

References
 fis-ski.com

World Cup
FIS Alpine Ski World Cup men's giant slalom discipline titles